Dilophodes elegans is a moth in the family Geometridae first described by Arthur Gardiner Butler in 1878. It is found in Japan, China, Taiwan, north-eastern Himalaya, Burma and Borneo.

The wingspan 39–43 mm. There are five overlapping generations per year in Nanning, China.

The larvae defoliate Illicium verum. The species overwinters in the larval or pupal stage in the leaves, litter or the epipedon.

Subspecies
Dilophodes elegans elegans (Japan)
Dilophodes elegans auribasis Prout, 1926 (north-eastern Himalaya, Burma, Borneo)
Dilophodes elegans khasiana Swinhoe, 1892 (Taiwan)
Dilophodes elegans sinica Wehrli, 1939 (China)

References

Moths described in 1878
Boarmiini
Moths of Japan
Moths of Borneo